Sacred Heart Catholic Church and School is a historic church and school at 503 North Queen Street in Palestine, Texas. It was designed by the prominent Texas architect Nicholas J. Clayton. It was built between 1890 and 1893 and replaced an earlier Catholic church that was destroyed by fire. 

It served the railroad workers stationed in Palestine, which had a large depot of the International–Great Northern Railroad. The railway deeded the site to Bishop Dubuis of the Diocese of Galveston. The bricks were locally made from mud from the Trinity River. It is the best example of Victorian Gothic architecture in North East Texas. 
 
Additional plots of land were acquired in the years after the church was built. The diocese added a parochial school and a cemetery.

It was built in 1968.  The church and school were added to the National Register of Historic Places in 1979.

See also

National Register of Historic Places listings in Anderson County, Texas
Recorded Texas Historic Landmarks in Anderson County

References

External links

Roman Catholic churches in Texas
Churches on the National Register of Historic Places in Texas
School buildings on the National Register of Historic Places in Texas
Gothic Revival church buildings in Texas
1890s architecture in the United States
Churches in Anderson County, Texas
National Register of Historic Places in Anderson County, Texas
Recorded Texas Historic Landmarks